The Template Attribute Language (TAL) is a templating language used to generate dynamic HTML and XML pages. Its main goal is to simplify the collaboration between programmers and designers. This is achieved by embedding TAL statements inside valid HTML (or XML) tags which can then be worked on using common design tools.

TAL was created for Zope but is used in other Python-based projects as well.

Attributes 
The following attributes are used, normally prefixed by "tal:":

 define
 creates local variables, valid in the element bearing the attribute (including contained elements)
 condition
 decides whether or not to render the tag (and all contained text)
 repeat
 creates a loop variable and repeats the tag iterating a sequence, e.g. for creating a selection list or a table
 content
 replaces the content of the tag
 replace
 replaces the tag (and therefore is not usable together with content or attributes)
 attributes
 replaces the given attributes (e. g. by using tal:attributes="name name; id name" the name and id attributes of an input field could be set to the value of the variable "name")
 omit-tag
 allows to omit the start and end tag and only render the content if the given expression is true.
 on-error
 if an error occurs, this attribute works like the content tag.

If a tag has more than one TAL attributes, they are evaluated in the above (fairly logical) order.

In cases when no tag is present which lends itself to take the attributes, special TAL tags can be used, making the "tal:" prefix optional. e.g.:
<tal:if condition="context/itemlist">
...
</tal:if>
would cause the code inside the tal:if tags to be used whenever the context (whatever the application server defines the context to be, e.g. an object) contains variable "itemlist" with a true value, e.g. a list containing at least one element. The identifier following the colon is arbitrary; it simply needs to be there, and to be the same for the opening and closing tag.

METAL 

The Macro Expansion Template Attribute Language (METAL) complements TAL, providing macros which allow the reuse of code across template files. Both were created for Zope but are used in other Python projects as well.

METAL complements TAL with the ability to reuse code. It allows the developer to define and use macros, which in turn may have slots; when using a macro, variational content can be specified for a slot.

When generating XML documents, the XML namespace must be specified
(xmlns:metal="http://xml.zope.org/namespaces/metal").

METAL attributes 
The following attributes are recognised, normally requiring a „metal:“ prefix:

 define-macro
 creates a macro
 define-slot
 creates a slot inside a macro
 use-macro
 uses a macro (normally given via a TALES path expression)
 fill-slot
 when using a macro, replaces the default content of the given slot
 extend-macro
 since Zope v3: extends a macro, comparable to subclassing, by redefining of slots

Normally, just one of those is used at a time.

In cases when no tag is present which lends itself to take the attributes, and in special cases when more than one METAL attribute is needed, special METAL tags can be used, making the „metal:“ prefix optional. E. g. (sketched with Roundup in mind):
 <html metal:define-macro="icing">
 ...
 <metal:myslot define-slot="optional-form">
 ...
 </html>
 
 <html metal:use-macro="templates/page/macros/icing">
 <form metal:fill-slot="optional-form" action="."
         tal:attributes="action context/designator">
 ...
 </form>
 </html>

Usage 
TAL/TALES/METAL are used by the following projects:
 Zope (web application server)
 Roundup (issue tracker)

Other implementations 
Besides the original Zope implementation, there are (not exhaustive):

Python 
 SimpleTAL
 OpenTAL 
 ZPT, a standalone version of Zope Page Templates
 Chameleon, a fast reimplementation of Zope Page Templates

C# 
 SharpTAL

Go (Golang) 
 tal, a native Go implementation of TAL, TALES and METAL

JavaScript 
template-tal, TAL Implementation for NodeJs
 jstal
 Distal
 DomTal
 ZPT-JS

Java 
 JPT: Java Page Templates
 JavaZPT 
 ZPT-Java

Perl 
 PETAL, the Perl Template Attribute Language 
 Template-TAL

Raku 
 Flower, a Raku implementation of TAL, with some Petal and PHPTAL extensions.

PHP 
 PHPTAL
 Twital
 Biscuit
 zTAL

XSL 
 XSLTal, transforming TAL via XSLT to XSLT

Common Lisp 
 TALCL: A library that implements the TAL template language for common lisp

Similar implementations 
 ATal – Not really a TAL implementation, but inspired on TAL concepts
 Thymeleaf - Not a TAL implementation, but a similar "natural template" language

References

External links 
 Zope Page Templates Reference (Zope Book)

Zope
Template engines